Joey Santolini (born Joseph Michael Santolini; December 1, 1987), better known by his stage name Tatianna, is an American drag queen, musician, and reality television personality from Washington, D.C. He is best known for competing on the second season of RuPaul's Drag Race and later the second season of RuPaul's Drag Race: All Stars. She released her debut album, T1, in 2018.

Early life 
Santolini was born on December 1, 1987 in Arlington, Virginia. He is of Italian and African American descent. He received a license in cosmetology after his senior year in high school. He started dressing as a girl when he was fourteen, and started drag professionally in 2007. He originally applied for season one of Drag Race, but was rejected for being too young.

Career 
Tatianna was announced as one of twelve contestants for the second season of RuPaul's Drag Race in November 2009. During the show, she won the first edition of the annual "Snatch Game" challenge, playing Britney Spears in episode four. She overall placed fourth in the competition after losing a lip sync of Aretha Franklin's "Something He Can Feel" to competitor Jujubee. Six years later, she was selected as one of ten contestants for the second season of RuPaul's Drag Race: All Stars, which was announced on June 17, 2016. He placed in the top two in the first episode, but lost a lip sync to Roxxxy Andrews. He was controversially eliminated by Alaska the following episode after placing in the bottom for his second snatch game as Ariana Grande. He returned in episode five and won $5,000 with Alyssa Edwards after a double-save lip sync to Rihanna's "Shut Up and Drive". He was controversially eliminated by Alaska again for placing in the bottom that following episode. He finished in sixth place overall.

Outside of Drag Race, he hosted his own web show on WOWpresents called Tea With Tati which premiered in April 2018. He announced on June 18, 2018, the release of a new fragrance called Choices produced by Xyrena.

Tatianna performed live with Charli XCX on October 13, 2018, singing a duet of Charli's song  "1999".

He portrayed Ariana Grande in the music video for Taylor Swift's "You Need to Calm Down" on June 17, 2019.

On August 26, 2019, Tatianna performed alongside Taylor Swift during her 2019 MTV Video Music Awards performance.

Personal life

In October 2019, Tatianna was detained outside of an Atlanta nightclub when she entered an employee's only door and reportedly verbally assaulted an employee. No charges were pressed.

Music 
Tatianna released her first single, "True" on November 8, 2010. A second single, "Touch" was released on May 6, 2011. Her third single, "Losing Control" was released on August 14, 2012. After a four-year hiatus, Tatianna released "The Same Parts" on September 1, 2016. She performed the single on the premiere episode of All Stars 2 as a spoken word version. Her fifth single, "Transform" was released on October 26, 2016. She released "Use Me" on November 28, 2017. Unlike his other singles, an official music video was released the same day as the single. She released her eleven-track debut album, "T1" on May 28, 2018. Rapper Cazwell and drag queen Salvadora Dali are featured guests on the album. A video for the fifth track, "CYA", was released on August 30, 2018.

Filmography

Film

Television

Music videos

Web series

Discography

Albums

Singles

References

External links 

 
 Tatianna on Discogs

American people of Italian descent
Living people
American drag queens
RuPaul's Drag Race contestants
1988 births
Tatianna
African-American drag queens
American LGBT singers
21st-century African-American male singers
LGBT people from Virginia